Abon (Abõ) is a Tivoid language of Nigeria.

Phonology

Long Consonants Chart

Vowel Chart of Abon Language

References

Further reading
 Ekpenyong, Moses & Udoinyang, Mfon & Urua, Eno-Abasi. (2009). A Robust Language Processor for African Tone Language Systems. Georgian Electronic Scientific Journal: Computer Science and Telecommunications. 623.

Languages of Cameroon
Tivoid languages